"Five-O" is the sixth episode of the first season of the AMC television series Better Call Saul, a spin-off series of Breaking Bad. The episode aired on March 9, 2015, on AMC in the United States. Outside of the United States, the episode premiered on the streaming service Netflix in several countries.

The episode received acclaim from critics, with Jonathan Banks's performance being singled out for praise.

Plot

Opening
In a flashback, Mike Ehrmantraut leaves a train in Albuquerque and re-bandages his wounded left shoulder, then meets his daughter-in-law Stacey and granddaughter Kaylee. Stacey and Mike briefly discuss the death of Matt, Mike's son and Stacey's husband. Afterward, Mike's wounded shoulder is treated by Dr. Caldera, an Albuquerque veterinarian.

Main story
Philadelphia detectives Sanders and Abbasi attempt to question Mike, who requests that Jimmy McGill represent him. The detectives are investigating the death of Mike's son Matt, a police officer who was killed in a 2001 ambush. Matt's partners, Troy Hoffman and Jack Fensky were killed in a similar ambush six months later and the detectives suspect Mike. Jimmy intentionally spills his coffee and Mike pretends to help Abbasi clean his jacket while stealing Abbasi's notebook.

Mike discovers from Abbasi's notes that Stacey contacted Philadelphia police after she discovered money Matt previously hid in the lining of a suitcase, hoping that investigating the source of the cash would help identify Matt's killer. In a flashback to Philadelphia, Mike breaks into a police car outside a bar. He then enters the bar and confronts Fensky and Hoffman. At closing time Mike announces he plans to move to Albuquerque. As he staggers home, Fensky and Hoffman offer him a ride and help him into the back seat.

Mike tells Fensky and Hoffman he knows they killed Matt. Fensky and Hoffman plan to kill Mike but Mike is not actually drunk. Mike shoots Fensky using the revolver he had hidden in the back seat when he broke into the car earlier. Hoffman attempts to draw his service pistol, but Mike kills him. Fensky wounds Mike in the left shoulder, and Mike shoots Fensky in the throat. Mike kills Fensky with a shot to the head, then walks away and prepares to depart for Albuquerque.

In Albuquerque, Mike admits to Stacey that corruption was rampant in Matt's precinct and included Mike. When Hoffman offered to include Matt, Matt asked for Mike's advice. Mike suggested not taking the bribes would mark him as a whistleblower, so he should accept. Hoffman and Fensky murdered him because his hesitation made them fear he would turn them in. Stacey asks who killed Hoffman and Fensky. Mike says now she knows what happened and asks if she can live with it.

Production 
The script was the first-ever television script written by Gordon Smith, who was previously a writer's assistant on Breaking Bad. It was directed by Adam Bernstein, who directed several episodes of Breaking Bad.

Reception 

Upon airing, the episode received 2.57 million American viewers, and an 18–49 rating of 1.3.

The episode received near universal acclaim, with unanimous praise for Jonathan Banks' performance, which some critics considered award-worthy. On Rotten Tomatoes, based on 25 reviews, it received a 100% approval rating with an average score of 8.80 out of 10. The site's consensus reads, "In a departure from the existing Better Call Saul narrative, 'Five-O' provides essential backstory for Mike's character, delivered in a gripping, award-worthy performance by Jonathan Banks."

Roth Cornet of IGN gave it a score of 9.7 out of 10, praising the performance of Jonathan Banks, the episode's pacing and interwoven storylines, as well as the final scene of the episode. She concluded, "Better Call Saul continues to deliver some of the best of what television has to offer as both those familiar with Breaking Bad and new viewers alike were given a shattering look at Mike's tragic past." Tim Surette of TV.com also highly praised the performance of Banks, and wrote it is worthy of an Emmy, calling it "one of the best episodes to date of 2015's best new show to date".

"Five-O" received three Primetime Emmy Award nominations. Jonathan Banks was nominated for Outstanding Supporting Actor in a Drama Series, Gordon Smith was nominated for Outstanding Writing for a Drama Series, and Kelley Dixon was nominated for Outstanding Single-Camera Picture Editing for a Drama Series. When Peter Dinklage won for Outstanding Supporting Actor, he praised the other nominees, and singled out Banks by name.

Notes

References

External links 
 "Five-O" at AMC
 

Better Call Saul (season 1) episodes